The Cathedral Church of Christ Marina, Lagos is an Anglican cathedral on Lagos Island, Lagos, Nigeria.

History

The foundation stone for the first cathedral building was laid on 29 March 1867 and the cathedral was established in 1869.

Construction of the current building to designs by architect Bagan Benjamin started on 1 November 1924. The foundation stone was laid by the Prince of Wales (later King Edward VIII) on 21 April 1925. It was completed in 1946.

In 1976 the relics of Rev Dr Samuel Ajayi Crowther, a former enslaved Yoruba man who became the first African bishop in the Anglican Church, were translated to the cathedral. There is a cenotaph erected as a memorial of him.

It is popularly known as the Cathedral Church of Christ Marina, and is the oldest Anglican cathedral in the Church of Nigeria. At various times in its history, the cathedral was the seat of the archbishop of the Province of West Africa, the seat of the archbishop and primate of All Nigeria and the seat of the archbishop of the Ecclesiastical Province of Lagos. It is currently the seat of the Bishop of Lagos.

The organ was built by Oberlinger Orgelbau, Germany on right side of the altar with two façades - one looking to the altar and second looking to the right nave. One of the sections, Antiphonal, is located at the organ loft above the main entrance to the church. At the beginning of 21st century the whole instrument was renewed (and console rebuilt) by English company Harrison & Harrison; it consists 64 stops on 4 manuals and a pedalboard. It is the largest organ in Nigeria.

In 1969, then president of Nigeria, Yakubu Gowon married Miss Victoria Zakari, at a ceremony officiated by Seth Irunsewe Kale at the Cathedral.

Gallery

References

Anglican cathedrals in Nigeria
George

Buildings and structures in Lagos
Lagos Island
Landmarks in Lagos
Religion in Lagos
Cathedrals in Nigeria
Gothic architecture in Nigeria
1924 establishments in Africa
Churches completed in 1946
20th-century Anglican church buildings
20th-century churches in Nigeria
Churches completed in 1869
19th-century Anglican church buildings
19th-century churches in Nigeria